The Stellar Missiles is a collection of science fiction short stories by American writer Ed Earl Repp.  It was published in 1949 by Fantasy Publishing Company, Inc. in an edition of 500 hardcover and 200 paperback copies.  The stories originally appeared in the magazines Science Wonder Stories, Amazing Stories and Planet Stories.

Contents
 "The Stellar Missiles"
 "The Second Missile"
 "The Quest of the Immortal"

References

1949 short story collections
Science fiction short story collections
Fantasy Publishing Company, Inc. books